Strezovce may refer to:
 Strezovce, Staro Nagoričane, North Macedonia
 Strezovce (Preševo), Serbia
 Strezovce mine, Kosovo